Twinlights is a 1995 EP by Scottish alternative rock band Cocteau Twins, released in September 1995 by Fontana Records. It was issued along with the EP Otherness as a teaser for the album Milk & Kisses. It is a mainly acoustic recording, with AllMusic referring to it as "being as close to an "unplugged" effort as the Twins ever got". The EP was originally released on CD as well as a 2x7" vinyl set.

The EP has four tracks, two of which were reimagined for Milk and Kisses ("Rilkean Heart" and "Half-Gifts"). "Pink Orange Red", which was released on the 1985 EP Tiny Dynamine, is a stripped-down version of the original with a piano playing the melody and opening. "Golden-Vein" is the only track on the EP not to appear on any other release.

Vocalist Elizabeth Fraser described the EP as being about a man she fell in love with during the 1994 Four-Calendar Cafe tour. The mystery man has been speculated to be Jeff Buckley by Fraser's biographer, but she has never confirmed or denied this.

Track listing 
All songs written by Cocteau Twins; string arrangements by Thomas M. Hill.

 "Rilkean Heart" – 2:22 
 "Golden-Vein" – 2:49 
 "Pink Orange Red" – 4:29 
 "Half-Gifts" – 4:15

Performers 
 Robin Guthrie
 Elizabeth Fraser
 Simon Raymonde
 Phil Boyden – violin
 Paul Costin – violin
 Fiona Griffith – viola
 Helen Thomas – cello

Charts

References 

1995 EPs
Cocteau Twins albums
Fontana Records EPs